25 Vulpeculae is a single star in the northern constellation of Vulpecula, located roughly 1,170 light years away from the Sun. It is visible to the naked eye as a faint, blue-white hued star with an apparent visual magnitude of 5.50 This object is moving closer to the Earth with a heliocentric radial velocity of −11 km/s.

This is a Be star with a stellar classification of B6 IVe, matching the spectrum of an aging subgiant with a circumstellar disk of ionized gas. Cowley (1972) had it rated as a more evolved giant star with a class of B8 IIIn, where the 'n' notation indicates "nebulous" lines due to rapid rotation. It has a high rate of spin, showing a projected rotational velocity of 160 km/s. The star has 7 times the mass of the Sun and 11 times the Sun's radius. It is radiating 1,345 times the luminosity of the Sun from its photosphere at an effective temperature of 13,170 K.

References

External links
 

B-type subgiants
B-type giants
Vulpecula
Durchmusterung objects
Vulpeculae, 25
193911
100435
7789
Be stars